Mallur railway station (Code: MALR)  is a railway station situated in Mallur, Salem district in the Indian state of Tamil Nadu. The station is an intermediate station on the newly commissioned – line which became operational in May 2013. The station is operated by the Southern Railway zone of the Indian Railways and comes under the Salem railway division.

References

Railway stations in Salem district
Salem railway division